{{DISPLAYTITLE:C37H40N2O6}}
The molecular formula C37H40N2O6 (molar mass: 608.723 g/mol, exact mass: 608.2886 u) may refer to:

 Berbamine
 Fangchinoline

Molecular formulas